Tziporah Heller Gottlieb is an American-born Haredi educator, author, and speaker based in Jerusalem. She is a senior faculty member at the Neve Yerushalayim College for Women, principal of the Bnos Avigail seminary on the Neve campus, and a lecturer for the online Jewish college, Naaleh.com. She specializes in textual analysis of Biblical literature and Jewish philosophy, and exploration of the role of women in Judaism. The author of eight books, she is also a weekly columnist for the Hamodia newspaper.

Early life and education
Born Tziporah Krasner in Brooklyn, New York, she studied at the Bais Yaakov elementary school. From 1966 to 1967, she attended the Rav Wolf Seminary in Bnei Brak.

Career
Following her marriage in 1967, she and her husband, Avraham Dovid Heller, resided for two years in the Galilee community of Segev, in an effort to establish a kollel there. After their return to Jerusalem, her husband became a lecturer at Ohr Somayach, and, later, the administrator of Yeshiva Pachad Yitzchok, located near their home in Har Nof. In 1970, she began teaching at the Neve Yerushalayim College of Jewish Studies for Women in the same neighborhood, becoming a full-time faculty member in 1980. In 2015, she became principal of the Bnos Avigail seminary on the Neve campus.

Heller specializes in textual analysis of Biblical literature and Jewish philosophy, with a focus on the commentaries of Rambam and Maharal. She also lectures on women in Judaism, and "the lives of women in the Bible and Prophets". She is noted for her ability to bring "lofty concepts" down to a practical level, embellished with true-life stories and a sense of humor. Her views on the role of women in Judaism are frequently cited.

She is also a lecturer for the online Jewish college Naaleh.com, and a weekly columnist for the Hamodia newspaper. Her 2000 book, This Way Up: Torah essays on spiritual growth, was culled from her columns in that newspaper in the 1990s. She conducts international speaking tours twice yearly. She has thousands of students around the globe, and her approbation is valued in the Jewish publishing world. In 2011, she was nominated for the Jewish Community Heroes award presented by the Jewish Federations of North America.

Personal
In 1967, she married Avraham Dovid Heller (1944–2013), and the two made aliyah to Israel. The couple had 14 children, and hosted many guests for Shabbat and Jewish holidays. They were married for 46 years, until Rabbi Heller's death in 2013. 

On Lag BaOmer 2020, she remarried to Rabbi Dovid Gottlieb.

Heller's son-in-law, Shmuel Goldstein, was seriously injured in the 2014 Jerusalem synagogue attack. Following the attack, Heller widely disseminated a letter that she had written to her family and friends describing the event, and also spoke to the media.

Bibliography

 (with Sara Yoheved Rigler)

References

Sources

Year of birth missing (living people)
Jewish educators
American Orthodox Jews
Israeli Orthodox Jews
Rebbetzins
People from Brooklyn
People from Jerusalem
American women writers
Religious writers
Living people
21st-century American women